Palander is a surname. Notable people with the surname include:

 Kalle Palander (born 1977), Finnish alpine skier
 Louis Palander (1842–1920), Swedish naval officer
 Tord Palander (1902–1972), Swedish economist

Finnish-language surnames